Looping, in education, refers to the practice of a teacher remaining with the same group of students for more than one school year. For example, a teacher who teaches a third grade class and then goes on to teach the same students, the following year, for the fourth grade.

This is distinct from the teacher of a multi-age class, who teaches a specific range of school grades together. In this case, although each child remains with the same teacher for multiple years, the group of students being taught changes annually as older children leave the group and are replaced by younger students entering.

Looping is usual in Waldorf education, where the traditional goal has been for a primary teacher to remain as the lead teacher of a class for eight consecutive years, though in conjunction with numerous specialized teachers; in recent decades, many schools have been reducing the loop to a shorter interval.

Benefits 
Educational advantages to having a single teacher have been found, including:

Teachers gain extra teaching time.
Teachers increase their knowledge about a child’s intellectual strengths and weaknesses increases in a way that is impossible to achieve in a single year,
Improved standardized test scores.
Long term teacher-student relationships have been noted to result in an emotional and intellectual climate that encourages thinking, risk-taking, and involvement.
Relationships also benefit. Students, parents, and teachers develop a sense of community and stability. Shy students have time to get comfortable. Difficult students have time to get used to consistent expectations. As a result, teachers note an improvement in classroom discipline.

Disadvantages 
Potential disadvantages of looping include:

Restricting the ability of teacher to perfect a lesson through repetition
Conflict/tension between students and teachers is not always resolved
Lapses in an instructor's teachings aren't necessarily corrected later on by a different instructor
A single teacher defines the character of the individual class, meaning each class carries with it its own unique and observable strengths and weaknesses throughout the looping grades.

References

External links
"In the Loop" from The Osgood File

Pedagogy
Philosophy of education